Selahattin is the Turkish spelling of the Arabic Muslim masculine given name Salah ad-Din (Arabic: صَلَاح الدِّيْن ṣalāḥ ad-dīn). Notable people with the name include:

People
 Selahattin Çolak, Turkish politician
 Selahattin Demirtaş (born 1972), Kurdish-Turkish politician
 Selâhattin Kantar (1878–1949), Turkish archaeologist
 Selahattin Kınalı (born 1978), Turkish footballer
Selahattin Özmen, Turkish surgeon
 Selahattin Ülkümen (1914–2003), Turkish diplomat who assisted Jews in WW2

See also
Dr. Selahattin Akçiçek Cultural Center

Turkish masculine given names